was a town located in Fujitsu District, Saga Prefecture, Japan.

On January 1, 2006, Shiota, along with the former town of Ureshino (also from Fujitsu District), was merged to create the city of Ureshino.

Geography
Shiota is located in the southwestern part of Saga, inland of the Ariake Sea. It is surrounded on three sides by mountains.
 Mountains: Mt. Tōsen, Mt. Kishima
 Rivers: Shiota River

Adjoining Municipalities
 Kashima
 Shiroishi
 Takeo
 Ureshino

History
 April 1, 1889 - The modern municipal system is formed and three villages exist in the current area occupied by Shiota: Shiota Village, Kuma Village, and Gochōda Village.
 October 5, 1918 - Shiota Village becomes Shiota Town.
 September 1, 1956 - Kuma Village and Gochōda Village are incorporated into Shiota Town.
 January 1, 2006 - Shiota Town and Ureshino Town merge to form Ureshino City.

Demographics
23.6% of the population of Shiota are 65 or older.

Education

High schools
 Saga Prefectural Industrial High School

Junior high schools
 Shiota Junior High School

Elementary schools
 Gochōda Elementary School
 Shiota Elementary School
 Kuma Elementary School
 Ureshino Associated Ōkusano Elementary School

Notable Places and Festivals
 O-Yama-san Matsuri-hi (お山さん祭り日), April 5
 Shiota Kunchi (塩田くんち), November 2–3
 Hachimangū Reisai, (annual festival for the god of war shrine) November 3
 Tanjō Shrine

Dissolved municipalities of Saga Prefecture